One human poll comprised the 1947 National Collegiate Athletic Association (NCAA) football rankings. Unlike most sports, college football's governing body, the NCAA, does not bestow a national championship, instead that title is bestowed by one or more different polling agencies.

There are two main weekly polls that begin in the preseason—the Associated Press Poll and the Coaches' Poll. The United Press Coaches' Poll began operation in 1950; in addition, the AP Poll did not begin conducting preseason polls until that same year.

Legend

AP Poll
The final official AP Poll was released on December 8, at the end of the 1947 regular season, weeks before the major bowls. The AP did not release a post-bowl season final poll regularly until 1968.

Unofficial Final Poll
The official final AP poll, taken in early December before the bowls, had Notre Dame No. 1 (107 first-place votes) and Michigan second, with 25 first-place votes. Michigan won the Rose Bowl 49–0 over USC while Notre Dame did not play in a bowl game. Detroit Free Press sports editor Lyall Smith arranged an unofficial post-bowl poll with only Michigan or Notre Dame as choices, which favored Michigan 226–119.

References

College football rankings